The Silver Beaver Award is the council-level distinguished service award of the Boy Scouts of America.  Upon nomination by their local Scout council and with the approval of the National Court of Honor, recipients of this award are registered adult leaders who have made an impact on the lives of youth through service given to the council. The Silver Beaver is an award given to those who implement the Scouting program and perform community service through hard work, self-sacrifice, dedication, and many years of service. It is given to those who do not seek it.

Award
The medal consists of a silver beaver pendant suspended from a blue and white ribbon worn around the neck.  Recipients may wear the corresponding square knot, with a white strand over a blue strand, on the BSA uniform. There is also a lapel pin authorized and available for civilian wear.

Using the United States Military as the model, silver awards are the highest awards in the BSA.

History
The Silver Beaver was introduced in 1931 as a pin-on medal, but due to the heavy weight of the medallion it was switched over to a neck ribbon in mid-1932.  A blue-white-blue ribbon bar was introduced in 1934 for informal uniform wear.   In 1946, ribbon bars were replaced by the current knot insignia.

The Silver Beaver was initially awarded only to men.  The Silver Fawn Award, an equivalent for women, was awarded starting in 1971.  It used the same knot insignia, but on a blue background, as women were mostly involved in Cub Scouting during this period.  The Silver Fawn was discontinued and the Silver Beaver began to be awarded to women in 1974.  A total of 2,455 Silver Fawns were awarded to outstanding women for support of Cub Scouting before the award was discontinued in 1974.

As this is a council BSA award, it is conceivably possible for a person to receive this award multiple times from different councils. It is believed that 12-16 people are double-recipients of the Silver Beaver in this manner.  There is no record of a triple-recipient.

Notable recipients

 Elliot Quincy Adams
 Dean Alford
 Thomas D. Allen
 Marvin J. Ashton
 Brent F. Ashworth
 Charles August
 Ellsworth Hunt Augustus
 Mark Evans Austad
 Béla H. Bánáthy
 Curtis H. Barnette
 Harold Roe Bartle
 Charles J. Bates
 Charles E. Bayless
 Kevin Beary
 Julius W. Becton Jr.
 Ezra Taft Benson
 Richard J. Berry
 Howard P. Boyd
 Pat Boyd
 John F. Brady
 Rodney H. Brady
 Holly Broadbent Sr.
 Carl W. Buehner
 Hal Bunderson
 Allen M. Burdett Jr.
 Harris Burgoyne
 M. Anthony Burns
 Ross Erin Butler Sr.
 Chris Buttars
 Matt Cartwright
 Bernard A. Clarey
 Richard A. Compton
 Hazen A. Dean
 Albert W. Dent
 John Randolph Donnell
 Gordon R. England
 Bob Etheridge
 David C. Evans
 Michael D. Fascitelli
 Abraham J. Feldman
 George Fischbeck
 Craig Fitzhugh
 Mike Fitzpatrick
 Karen Fraser
 Ronald Alan Fritzsche
 Kendall D. Garff
 Sandy Garrett
 Lloyd D. George
 John Gottschalk
 Francis A. Gregory
 Terry L. Grove
 Robert E. Guglielmone
 Wayne B. Hales
 Lee Heider
 Francisco Joglar Herrero
 Lewis Blaine Hershey
 George R. Hill III
 James G. Howes
 Peter W. Hummel
 Brad Hutto
 Paul Ilyinsky
 Peter Johnsen
 John C. Keegan
 William H. Keeler
 Walter Kidde
 Walter Livingston
 David M. Lockton
 Charles L. Mader
 Thomas P. Mahammitt
 François E. Matthes
 Morton D. May
 James M. McCoy
 Joseph Melrose
 Robert Mitchell
 Keith Monroe
 Thomas S. Monson
 Ellie Morrison
 Roger Mosby
 Horace A. Moses
 Wendell Nedderman
 Leonard Niederlehner
 Dan Ownby
 Ephraim Laurence Palmer
 Edward A. Pease
 Hector Perez
 Wayne M. Perry
 Hollie Pihl
 Skip Priest
 Ben Reifel
 Mark Ricks
 Brooks Robinson
 Edward L. Rowan
 Dan Rusanowsky
 Marvin Scott
 Robert H. Shaffer
 Mark Shurtleff
 Max I. Silber
 Delford M. Smith
 George Albert Smith
 Vaughn Soffe
 Carl E. Stewart
 Thomas L. Tatham
 John R. Taylor III
 Dick Vermeil
 Frank H. Wadsworth
 Walter Washington
 Laurence Hawley Watres
 Lance B. Wickman
 Lester B. Wikoff
 Cardis Cardell Willis
 Jack Zink
 Peter Zug

References

Advancement and recognition in the Boy Scouts of America
Awards established in 1931